Richard E. Baldwin is a professor of international economics at the Graduate Institute of International and Development Studies in Geneva, where he has been researching globalization and trade since 1991. He was the former President of the Centre for Economic Policy Research (CEPR). He is Editor-in-Chief of VoxEU, which he founded in June 2007. He is a research associate at the National Bureau of Economic Research and was twice elected as a Member of the Council of the European Economic Association. Baldwin has been called "one of the most important thinkers in this era of global disruption".

Career 
After obtaining a bachelor's degree in economics from the University of Wisconsin-Madison in 1980, he received a master's degree from the London School of Economics in 1981. He completed his PhD at MIT in 1986 under the guidance of Paul Krugman, with whom he has co-authored half a dozen articles. He received honorary doctorates from the Turku School of Economics (Finland), University of St. Gallen (Switzerland) and Pontifical Catholic University of Peru (PUCP). The International Economic Association made him a Schumpeter-Haberler Distinguished Fellow in 2021.

He was Associate Professor (1989–1991) and Assistant Professor (1986–1989) at Columbia University Business School. In 1990–1991 he followed trade matters for the President's Council of Economic Advisors in the Bush White House.  He worked as an Associate Economic Affairs Officer for UNCTAD in the early 1980s.  In 1991 he joined the Graduate Institute of International and Development Studies as Professor of International Economics, where he has remained. He has also been a visiting research professor at MIT (2003), Oxford (2012-2015), and is still an  Associate Member of Nuffield College at Oxford University. He has consulted for many governments and international organisations including the EU, the OECD, the World Bank, EFTA, and USAID.

Research 

He has published extensively in the areas of globalisation, international trade, regionalism, WTO, European integration, economic geography, political economy and growth, and is recognised as an expert on the economic drivers and risks of globalisation. His book, The Great Convergence: Information Technology and the New Globalization, was published in November 2016 and listed among the Best Books of 2016 by The Financial Times and The Economist magazine.  He also writes extensively on current economic policy. He has over 51,000 Google Scholar cites and an H-index of 94.

His latest book, The Globotics Upheaval: Globalization, Robotics and the Future of Work, addresses the role of digital technology in driving both globalisation and automation of service and professional jobs in advanced economies; it has been translated into six languages. With Charles Wyplosz, he has a leading textbook on the Economics of European Integration, which is in its 7th Edition with McGraw-Hill.

Selected books 

Baldwin, Richard, Towards an Integrated Europe, CEPR Press, 1994. 
Baldwin, Richard E., and J. Francois, Dynamic Issues in Commercial Policy Analysis. Cambridge University Press, 1999. 
 Baldwin, R., D. Cohen, A. Sapir, and A. Venables (1999). Market Integration, Regionalism and the Global Economy.  Cambridge University. 
 Baldwin, R. and Aymo Brunetti (2001). Economic Impact of EU Membership on Entrants: New Methods and Issues.  Springer.  
 Baldwin, R., Forslid, R., Martin, P., Ottaviano, G., & Robert-Nicoud, F. (2011). Economic geography and public policy. Princeton University Press. 
 Baldwin, R. Mashiro Kawai , Ganeshan Wignaraja (2015). A World Trade Organization for the 21st Century: The Asian Perspective. Edward Elgar Publishing. 
 Baldwin, R. and C. Wyplosz (2016). The Economics of European Integration. McGraw-Hill Inc. 
 Baldwin, R. (2016). The Great Convergence, Harvard University Press. 
 Baldwin, R. (2019). The Globotics Upheaval : Globalization, Robotics, and the Future of Work. Oxford University Press.

References

External links
 

Academic staff of the Graduate Institute of International and Development Studies
American economists
Year of birth missing (living people)
Living people
University of Wisconsin–Madison alumni
Alumni of the London School of Economics
MIT School of Humanities, Arts, and Social Sciences alumni
Writers about globalization